= OR8G2 =

Protein-coding gene in the species Homo sapiens

OR8G2P

Identifiers
- Aliases: OR8G2P, HSTPCR120, OR8G4, ORL206, ORL486, TPCR120, OR8G2, olfactory receptor family 8 subfamily G member 2, olfactory receptor family 8 subfamily G member 2 pseudogene
- External IDs: MGI: 3030063; GeneCards: OR8G2P

Gene location (Human)
Chr.	Chromosome 11 (human)
Band	11q24.2	Start	124,224,732 bp
Band	11q24.2	End	124,225,666 bp

Gene location (Mouse)
Chr.	Chromosome 9 (mouse)
Band	9|9 A5.1	Start	39,818,632 bp
Band	9|9 A5.1	End	39,824,028 bp
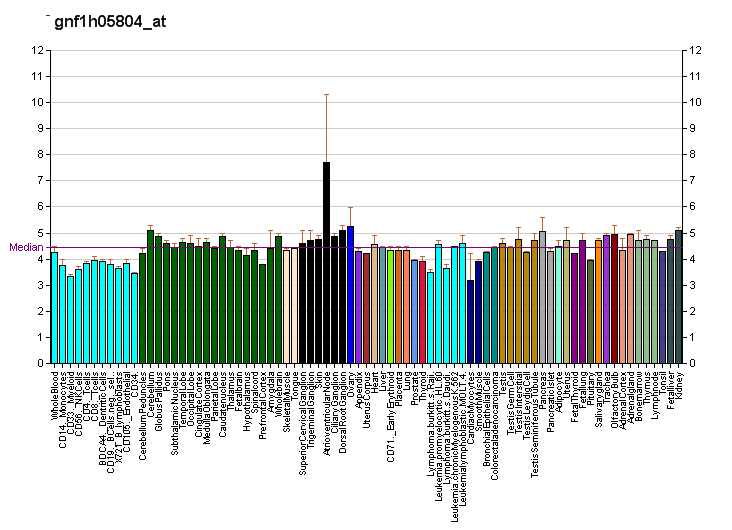
RNA expression pattern
Bgee	Human / Mouse (ortholog); n/a / n/a
BioGPS	More reference expression data
Gene ontology
Molecular function	G protein-coupled receptor activity; signal transducer activity; olfactory receptor activity; odorant binding
Cellular component	integral component of membrane; plasma membrane; membrane
Biological process	sensory perception of smell; detection of chemical stimulus involved in sensory perception of smell; signal transduction; response to stimulus; G protein-coupled receptor signaling pathway
Sources:Amigo / QuickGO
Orthologs
Databases	NCBI: entry; OMA: entry
Species	Human	Mouse
Entrez	26492	258606
Ensembl	ENSG00000181214	ENSMUSG00000095390
UniProt	Q6IF36	Q8VFN5
RefSeq (mRNA)	NM_001291438	NM_146613
RefSeq (protein)	NP_001278367	NP_666824
Location (UCSC)	Chr 11: 124.22 – 124.23 Mb	Chr 9: 39.82 – 39.82 Mb
PubMed search
- Wikidata
View/Edit Human	View/Edit Mouse

Olfactory receptor 8G2 is a protein that in humans is encoded by the OR8G2 gene.

Olfactory receptors interact with odorant molecules in the nose, to initiate a neuronal response that triggers the perception of a smell. The olfactory receptor proteins are members of a large family of G-protein-coupled receptors (GPCR) arising from single coding-exon genes. Olfactory receptors share a 7-transmembrane domain structure with many neurotransmitter and hormone receptors and are responsible for the recognition and G protein-mediated transduction of odorant signals. The olfactory receptor gene family is the largest in the genome. The nomenclature assigned to the olfactory receptor genes and proteins for this organism is independent of other organisms.

== See also ==
- Olfactory receptor
